Constitution Day is a holiday to honour the constitution of a country. Constitution Day is often celebrated on the anniversary of the signing, promulgation or adoption of the constitution, or in some cases, to commemorate the change to constitutional monarchy.

 Abkhazia, 26 November (1994). See Constitution of Abkhazia.
 Andorra, 14 March (1993). Known locally as Dia de la Constitució. See Constitution of Andorra.
 Argentina, 1 May (1853). See Constitution of Argentina. Not a public holiday.
 Armenia, 5 July (1995). See Constitution of Armenia.
 Australia, 9 July (1900). See Constitution of Australia. Not a public holiday.
 Azerbaijan, 12 November (1995). See Constitution of Azerbaijan. Not a public holiday.
 Belarus, 15 March (1994). Known locally as Dzień Kanstytucyji. See Constitution of Belarus.
 Belgium, 21 July (1890). Known locally as Nationale feestdag van België (in Dutch) and Fête nationale belge (in French).
 Day of the Flemish Community, 11 July (Flemish community only). Known locally as Feestdag van Vlaanderen.
 French Community Holiday, 27 September (French-speaking community only). Known locally as Fête de la Communauté française.
 Wallonia Day, third Sunday of September (Walloon Region only).
 Day of the German-speaking Community of Belgium, 15 November (German-speaking community only). Known locally as Feiertag der Deutschsprachigen Gemeinschaft.
 Brazil, 15 November (1889). Known in Brazil as Dia da Proclamação da República (Republic Day). See Constitution of Brazil. Public holiday.

 Cambodia, 24 September (1993). See Cambodia Constituent Assembly.
 Canada Day, 1 July (1867). Also known as Fête du Canada (in French). See Constitution of Canada.
 China:
 Mainland China, 4 December (1982). See Constitution of the People's Republic of China. Not a public holiday.
 Cook Islands, 4 August (1965). Known locally as Te Maeva Nui Celebrations. See Politics of the Cook Islands.
 Denmark, 5 June (1849, 1953). Known locally as Grundlovsdag. See Constitution of Denmark.
 Dominican Republic, 6 November (1844). See History of the Dominican Republic.
 Ethiopia, 16 July (1931). See 1931 Constitution of Ethiopia.
 Faroe Islands, 5 June (1849, 1953). Known locally as Grundlovsdag. See Constitution of Denmark.
 Federated States of Micronesia, 10 May (1979).
 Fiji, 7 September (2013). First observed in 2016. See 2013 Constitution of Fiji.
 Finland, 17 July (1919). The first Constitution of Finland, Constitution Act was enacted at that day and Finland became definitively a republic. Not a public holiday like the national day of Finland, Independence Day, 6 December (1917).
 Germany, 23 May (1949). Constitution Day
 Ghana, 7 January (2019). See Constitution of Ghana.
 India, 26 November (1949). Indian Constitution was adopted by the Constituent Assembly on 26 November. Celebrated all over India. Also known as National Law Day and Samvidhan Divas. Not a public holiday. See also Republic Day, celebrated on 26 January to commemorate the promulgation of the constitution and mark the formation of a republic.
 Indonesia, 18 August (1945). See Constitution of Indonesia. Not a public holiday.
 Ireland, 29 December (1937). See Constitution of Ireland. Not a public holiday.
 Italy, 1 January (1948). See Constitution of Italy.
 Japan, 3 May (1947). See Constitution of Japan.
 Kazakhstan, 30 August (1995). See Constitution of Kazakhstan.
 Korea: 
 North Korea, 27 December (1972). See Constitution of North Korea.
 South Korea, 17 July (1948). See Constitution of South Korea.
 Kyrgyzstan, 5 May (1993). See Constitution of Kyrgyzstan.
 Latvia, 1 May (1920). Day of Inauguration of the Constitutional Assembly of Latvia. See Constitution of Latvia.
 Lithuania, 25 October (1992). See Constitution of Lithuania.
 Marshall Islands, 1 May (1979). See Compact of Free Association.
 Maldives, 22 December (1932).
 Mexico, 5 February (1917). Known locally as Día de la Constitución. See Constitution of Mexico. Public holiday for Constitution Day is first Monday of February.

 Mongolia, 13 January (1924). See Constitution of Mongolia.
 Netherlands, 3 November (1848).
 Niue, 19 October (1974). See Niue Constitution Act.
 Norway, 17 May (1814). Known locally as Syttande mai. See Constitution of Norway.
 Pakistan, 23 March (1973). See Constitution of Pakistan.
 Palau, 9 July (1980). See Constitution of Palau.
 Philippines, 2 February (1987). See the 1987 Constitution. Known locally as Araw ng Saligang Batas (in Filipino). First observed in 2002.
 Poland, 3 May (1791). Known locally as Święto Konstytucji 3 Maja. See Constitution of 3 May 1791, public holiday
 Puerto Rico, 25 July (1952). Known locally as Día de la Constitución del Estado Libre Asociado. Also commemorated as Occupation Day (1898). See Constitution of Puerto Rico.
 Romania, 8 December (1991). See Constitution of Romania. Not a public holiday.
 Russia, 12 December (1993). Has been a working holiday since 2005. See Constitution of Russia.
 Serbia, 15 February (1835). Known locally as Dan državnosti. See Constitution of Serbia.
 Slovakia, 1 September (1992). Known locally as Deň Ústavy Slovenskej republiky. See Constitution of the Slovak Republic. 
 Spain, 6 December (1978). Known locally as Día de la Constitución Española. See Constitution of Spain.
 Sweden, 6 June (1809, 1974). Known locally as Sveriges nationaldag. Also known as the Day of the Swedish flag. See Basic Laws of Sweden.

 Switzerland, 12 September (1848). Adoption of the 1st Federal Constitution. See Swiss Federal Constitution. Not a public holiday.
 Taiwan, 25 December (1947). See Constitution of the Republic of China. Not a public holiday.
 Tajikistan, 6 November (1994)
 Thailand, 10 December (1932). Known locally as Wan Ratthathammanun. See Constitution of Thailand.
 Turks and Caicos Islands, 30 August (1976).
 Turkmenistan, 18 May (1992)
 Ukraine, 28 June (1996). See Constitution of Ukraine.
 United States, 17 September (1787). Known as Constitution Day. Not a public holiday.
 Uruguay, 18 July (1830). Known locally as Jura de la Constitución (de la República Oriental del Uruguay). See Constitution of Uruguay.
 Uzbekistan, 8 December (1992). Known locally as Konstitutsiya Kuni (in Uzbek). See Constitution of Uzbekistan.
 Vanuatu, 5 October (1979). See Constitution of Vanuatu.

See also

 Fiestas Patrias – Homeland national holidays of Mexico
 Flag Day
 Independence Day
 National Day
 Pledge Across America
 Public holiday
 Republic Day

References

External links

Constitution days
Types of national holidays
January observances
February observances
March observances
May observances
June observances
July observances
August observances
September observances
October observances
November observances
December observances
Public holidays in Cambodia